

The following properties are listed on the National Register of Historic Places in Orleans Parish, Louisiana.

This is intended to be a complete list of the properties and districts on the National Register of Historic Places in Orleans Parish, Louisiana, United States, which is consolidated with the city of New Orleans. The locations of National Register properties and districts for which the latitude and longitude coordinates are included below, may be seen in a map.

There are 187 properties and districts listed on the National Register in the parish, including 25 National Historic Landmarks.  Four properties were once listed, but have since been removed.

Current listings

|}

Former listings

|}

See also

History of New Orleans
Buildings and architecture of New Orleans
List of National Historic Landmarks in Louisiana
National Register of Historic Places listings in Louisiana

References

Orleans Parish
New Orleans-related lists